Doric may refer to:

 Doric, of or relating to the Dorians of ancient Greece
 Doric Greek, the dialects of the Dorians
 Doric order, a style of ancient Greek architecture
 Doric mode, a synonym of Dorian mode
 Doric dialect (Scotland)
 Doric Club, a paramilitary organization which fought against the Lower Canada Rebellion
 Doric Park, a park in Liverpool, England
 Doric Organ, a 1960s Combo organ produced in Italy
 Doric String Quartet, a string quartet based in the UK
 SS Doric (1883), a British ocean liner operated by White Star Line
 SS Doric (1923), another ship operated by White Star Line

See also
Dorian (disambiguation), a synonym